Nam Trà My is a rural district (huyện) of Quảng Nam province in the South Central Coast region of Vietnam. The district is known for its production of Saigon Cinnamon. As of 2003 the district had a population of 19,876. The district covers an area of 822 km². The district capital lies at Trà Mai.

References

Districts of Quảng Nam province